Tobaku Datenroku Kaiji: One Poker-hen is the fifth part of the manga series Kaiji by Nobuyuki Fukumoto. It ran in Kodansha's seinen manga magazine Weekly Young Magazine from 2013 to 2017. Kodansha collected its chapters in sixteen tankōbon volumes, released from November 6, 2013, to January 5, 2018. It was followed by the sixth part, Tobaku Datenroku Kaiji: 24 Oku Dasshutsu-hen.


Volume list

References

Kaiji manga chapter lists